St. Mary's Church is an Anglican church on Yule Avenue in the suburb of Middle Swan, Western Australia.  St. Mary's was built in 1868 on the site of an earlier church which had been built there in 1838. The church is part of the Anglican Diocese of Perth.  The church and graveyard overlook the Swan River in the Swan Valley district.

The church can seat 150 people and is open by appointment only.

History
On 5 August 1839 the foundation stone for the original church was laid, and opened fifteen months later by Governor John Hutt on 29 November 1840.  It was built on land owned by the Church Mission Society and in memory of Lucy Yule, the wife of Magistrate  Yule who died and was the first person buried on the site in 1838.

The land was believed to be the site of a landing during James Stirling's expedition in 1827.  The church was built with an octagonal layout and could hold about 100 people. It was consecrated in 1848 and remained in use until 1869.

Rev. William Mitchell was the first Minister to attend the church.

A new (and the current) rectangular church was built in 1868–69 immediately adjacent to the old octagonal church.  It was designed by Richard Roach Jewell and consecrated by Bishop Matthew Hale on 10 March 1869.

The adjoining graveyard includes graves of many notable European settlers of the Swan River Colony from 1838.

References

Notes

Bibliography

External links

Middle Swan
Middle Swan
Middle Swan, Western Australia
State Register of Heritage Places in the City of Swan
Victorian architecture in Western Australia
19th-century Anglican church buildings
Churches completed in 1903
1839 establishments in Australia